Ted Wade Abernathy (March 6, 1933 – December 16, 2004) was an American professional baseball player and right-handed pitcher.

Abernathy was a member of the Washington Senators (1955–57, 1960), Cleveland Indians (1963–64), Chicago Cubs (1965–66, 1969–70), Atlanta Braves (1966), Cincinnati Reds (1967–68), St. Louis Cardinals (1970) and Kansas City Royals (1970–72). He compiled a 63–69 record with 765 strikeouts and a 3.46 ERA in 1,147 innings pitched. He gave up 1,010 hits and permitted 592 bases on balls.

A native of Stanley, North Carolina, Abernathy was born on March 6, 1933, to Wade and Genora (McGinnis) Abernathy. He graduated from Stanley High School and signed with the Senators in 1952. In 1953 he married Margie Clemmer. The couple had two sons, Ted Jr. and Todd.

Pitching career
Abernathy changed his pitching motion from an overhead delivery to a three-quarter delivery after tearing two muscles in his shoulder making a throw from the outfield during his freshman year of high school. After shoulder surgery in 1959 left his career in doubt, he switched from the three-quarter delivery and become an effective sidearmer who developed a submarine pitch. Abernathy spent two years in the minor leagues before being called up by the Senators in April 1955. Throughout most of the 1950s, he split time between the Senators' major league squad and their farm system. 

During the Korean War, Abernathy was drafted into the U.S. Army, serving with medics, driving an ambulance and repairing vehicles. He served at Fort McPherson, Georgia. Abernathy was discharged as a corporal in time to join the Senators for 1955 spring training. He made his Major League debut for the Senators at age 22 on April 13, 1955, in 19–1 loss to the New York Yankees at Yankee Stadium. In the fourth inning, Abernathy relieved Mickey McDermott and struck out Andy Carey before giving up a home run to Mickey Mantle followed by a groundout by Yogi Berra. Every one of his 34 MLB starting pitcher assignments came with the 1955–57 Senators, a struggling, second-division team in the American League. Abernathy threw seven complete games and two shutouts as a starter, but won only eight of 30 decisions during that three-year period.

Sold to the Cubs in April 1965, Abernathy recorded a league-leading 31 saves (again for a second-division team), along with 104 strikeouts and a 2.57 ERA. He had 28 saves, 88 strikeouts, and a 1.27 ERA two seasons later with Cincinnati. In both 1965 and 1967, he led the league in saves, and won the TSN Reliever of the Year Award. He led the National League in games pitched three times: 1965 (with 84, a major-league record at the time), 1967 and 1968.

After baseball
After retiring from the game, Abernathy worked at Summey Building Systems in Dallas, North Carolina, and later worked with his son at his landscaping business, Todd Abernathy Landscaping, and was a member of the First United Methodist Church of Dallas. He enjoyed playing softball and tinkering with old cars and was active in several organizations including the Masonic Lodge, the Shriners and Major League Baseball's alumni society.

During his later years, Abernathy suffered from Alzheimer's disease and lived at the Belaire Health Care Center in Gastonia, North Carolina. Ted Abernathy died at age 71 on December 16, 2004, in Gastonia. He is interred at the Garden of Four Seasons in Gaston Memorial Park, Gastonia, North Carolina.

See also
List of Major League Baseball annual saves leaders

References

External links

The Deadball Era Obituary

1933 births
2004 deaths
Atlanta Braves players
Austin Senators players
Baseball players from Illinois
Baseball players from North Carolina
Charlotte Hornets (baseball) players
Chattanooga Lookouts players
Chicago Cubs players
Cincinnati Reds players
Cleveland Indians players
Jacksonville Suns players
Kansas City Royals players
Leones del Caracas players
American expatriate baseball players in Venezuela
Louisville Colonels (minor league) players
Major League Baseball pitchers
Miami Marlins (IL) players
People from Dallas, North Carolina
People from Gaston County, North Carolina
Roanoke Rapids Jays players
St. Louis Cardinals players
Salt Lake City Bees players
Vancouver Mounties players
Washington Senators (1901–1960) players
Wilson Pennants players